Soleil is an album by Jean-Pierre Ferland, released in 1971. It is a double album with as many as 14 songs. Guitarist David Spinozza is featured on the album, he has played on Jean-Pierre Ferland's previous album Jaune which was published in 1970, and he who would also play with Paul and Linda McCartney on their album Ram in 1971.

Track list 
All tracks written and composed by Jean-Pierre Ferland and Paul Baillargeon, except "Sœur Marie" by Ferland, Baillargeon and David Spinozza.
Side one
Le monde est parallèle
Mon frère
Monsieur Gobeil
J'ai neuf ans

Side two
Au fond des choses le soleil emmène au soleil
Sœur Marie de l'Enfant Jésus
Si on s'y mettait

Side three
Toi et moi
Mon ami J.C.
Sur la route 11

Side four
Fais dodo
Rose Magui
Jennifer
Pot-pourri endiablé de quelques succès du disque

Musicians 
 Jean-Pierre Ferland : Vocals
 Paul Baillargeon : piano, organ, synthesizer, orchestrations
 Claude Demers : Synthesizer programming
 David Spinozza : Acoustic and electric guitars 
 Don Habib : Bass 
 Richard Provençal : Drums 
 Denise Lupien, Maurice Pelletier, Nicole Laflamme, Hélène Rioux, Josianne Roy, Francine Lupien, Sylvie Laville, Denise Boucher, Lorraine Desmarais, William Lunn, Jean-Luc Morin :  Strings 
 Serge Chevanel, Jean-Louis Chatel, Jean-Pierre Carpentier, Julio Massella, Ted Griffith, Émile Subirana : Brass
 Marcel Baillargeon : Flute
 Nick Ayoub : Oboe
 Charles Linton, Denis Forcier, Patricia Gallant, Judy Richards, France Castel, Denise Bérard, Paul Baillargeon, Louise Lemire : Chorus
 Pierre Béluse: Percussion
 Michel Séguin: Congas

Production 
 Jean-Pierre Ferland : Production
 André Perry : Production, sound engineer, mixing
 Claude Demers : Engineer 
 Studios André Perry (Montreal) : Recording and mixing 
 Sidney Massari : Album cover and booklet 
 Ronald Labelle :  Photography
 Roxanne Gagnon : Illustration

References

 http://www.qim.com/albums/description.asp?albumid=232

Jean-Pierre Ferland albums
1971 albums
French-language albums
Barclay (record label) albums